The Chilean International Exhibition was a world's fair held in Quinta Normal Park, Santiago, between 16 September 1875 and 16 January 1876 to show Chilean people recent technological and scientific advances.

Organisation
The event was organised by the National Agricultural Society, opened by the president Federico Errázuriz Zañartu, and originally scheduled to run until 31 December 1875, but it was extended to 16 January 1876.

Location and buildings
The fair took place on what is now the Quinta Normal Park with a central permanent palace, which is now the Chilean National Museum of Natural History). There were two long buildings, which formed the machinery gallery and the Rose Innes pavilion, housing threshing machines, a restaurant and a pavilion each for Belgium and France.

Participants
Foreign countries who participated were
Argentina, 
Belgium, 
Bolivia, 
Brazil, 
Colombia, 
Ecuador, 
El Salvador, 
France, 
Germany, 
Great Britain, 
Guatemala, 
Italy, 
Mexico, 
Nicaragua, 
Peru,
Switzerland,
The United States, 
Uruguay 
and 
Venezuela.

Exhibitors
Exhibitors included the Chilean painter Onofre Jarpa who won a medal.

References

External links
 Catalogue for the fair

1875 establishments in Chile
1876 disestablishments
Events in Santiago
World's fairs in South America